The L.R. Ingersoll Physics Museum is located on the second floor of Chamberlin Hall on the University of Wisconsin-Madison campus. It is one of several museums on the University of Wisconsin-Madison campus that focus on hands-on exhibits and public outreach. The museum runs on donations and charges no admission.

History 
The museum was established in 1918 by Professor Snow and the museum's namesake, Leonard Rose Ingersoll (1880-1958), who taught at the University of Wisconsin-Madison. L.R. Ingersoll began advocating for the museum in 1917 and it became the first museum in the United States to focus solely on physics. Ingersoll wanted to create a museum that was accessible to young audiences. Since then, exhibits have continued to be designed by University of Wisconsin-Madison faculty and added to the museum.

Exhibits
The L.R. Ingersoll Physics Museum displays more than 70 interactive exhibits that cross several categories of Physics concepts.

A few exhibits include:

Mechanics
Gravity Pit - demonstrates the concept of a gravity well with a hyperbolic funnel wishing well.
Newton's Cradle
Pulleys
Spinning Platform
Gyroscope
Foucault Pendulum
Torsion Pendulum
Unequal Arm Balance
Coupled Pendulums

Electricity and Magnetism
AC - DC Generators
Series and parallel circuits puzzle
Circle of Magnetism
Dynamo 1 and 2
Induced Currents - Eddy Currents
Lenz's Law
The Magnetic Field - Lines of Force
The Rotating Copper Disk
Rotating Pepsi Can
Helmholtz Coils
Electrons Beam

Light and Optics
Additive Color Mixing
Subtractive Color Mixing
Color of an Object
Light and Atomic Spectra
Mystery Window
The Radiometer
Polarized Light
Light Waves
Telescope
Convex, Plane & Concave Mirrors
As Others See You
Your Profiles
Infinite Reflections
Real Image

Wave and Sound
Transverse Waves
Sound Pipes

Modern Physics
Plasma Tube
Cosmic Rays
Spirograph
Probability Board

Computer Demonstrations
Chaos Demonstration
Lissajous Curve Demonstration
Your Voice

References

External links 

 L.R. Ingersoll Physics Museum website

Museums in Madison, Wisconsin
L.R. Ingersoll Physics Museum
Science museums in Wisconsin
University museums in Wisconsin